Thunderstorm, also known as Tormenta, is a 1956 British drama film directed by John Guillermin and starring Carlos Thompson, Linda Christian, and Charles Korvin. It was made by British Lion Films.

Plot summary

A mysterious beautiful girl Maria (Linda Christian) is discovered unconscious and alone on board a small damaged yacht at sea. Some fishermen including Diego (Carlos Thompson) take Maria back to the nearest coastal Spanish Fishing Village for her to recover and offer to repair her small yacht. While all of the men in the village are infatuated with Maria, the women of the village view her with jealousy and suspicion, saying that she is a curse on their village and blaming her for the recent scarcity of fishing which the village solely relies on for income. When Maria is attacked by a mob of village women tearing her hair and clothes and bruising her, only the local Padre (José Marco Davó) saves her while also reprimanding the village women and telling them that Pablo (Charles Korvin) is the person to blame. The film ends with Maria quietly leaving by setting out to sea in her repaired small yacht with Diego (Carlos Thompson) watching from the small harbor.

Cast
 Carlos Thompson as Diego Martinez
 Linda Christian as Maria Ramon
 Charles Korvin as Pablo Gardia
 Catharina Ferraz as Diego's Mother
José Marco Davó as Padre Flores

Production
In April 1955 it was announced the film would be made by Hemisphere Productions, the company of Mike Frankovich. Filming would take place in London and Spain with Carlos Thompson and Linda Christian starring. Allied Artists were to distribute in the western hemisphere, British Lion in England and Columbia elsewhere. The script was to be by Geoffrey Holmes (the nom de plume for Daniel Mainwaring).

The official producer was Binnie Barnes and Victor Pahlen.

It was John Guillermin's return to features after directing TV for a time.

Reception
Monthly Film Bulletin called it "a refreshingly individual and unpretentious production."

References

External links

Thunderstorm at Letterbox DVD
Review of film at Variety

Films directed by John Guillermin
1956 films
1956 drama films
British drama films
1950s English-language films
1950s British films
British black-and-white films